Leo Mishkin (January 22, 1907 - December 27, 1980) was an American film, theater, and television critic of the mid-20th century.   He was also a long-time member of the New York Film Critics Circle and served at least one term as chair.

Biography
He was born on January 22, 1907, to Herman Mishkin and Rose Kissin. His father was the photographer for the Metropolitan Opera from 1905 to 1932.

He worked as a publicity director for Rex Ingram, a silent film director, and as a journalist for the Chicago Tribune’s Paris outpost in the late 1920s, and covered Charles Lindbergh's arrival in Paris in 1927.

He was a critic for the New York Morning Telegraph from 1934 until 1971, when he retired.

He died on December 27, 1980, in Santa Monica, California.

Legacy
The American Heritage Center at the University of Wyoming holds an archive of Mishkin's papers.

References

1980 deaths
American film critics
1907 births
Place of birth missing
20th-century American non-fiction writers